Bergen is a village near Neuburg an der Donau, in Neuburg-Schrobenhausen, in Upper Bavaria, in Bavaria. The place is known locally as Baring. It is part of the municipality of Neuburg an der Donau.

Location
Bergen lies about 8 km north of Neuburg an der Donau.

Sights
Pilgrims church of the Holy Cross: Rococo frescoes by Johann Wolfgang Baumgartner, with Roman tower and Roman crypt (with the Rococo changes undertaken sensitively); Renaissance epitaph for Wilhalm von Muhr and his wife (by the sculptor Loy Hering).

History of the church
787 first mention at the time of Karl the Great
976 establishment by Wiltrudis
27 September 988 confirmation of the establishment by Johannes XV
1007 delivery of the monastery by emperor Heinrich 11th to the Bamberg diocese  
1095 consecration of a church new building by bishop Ulrich I of Eichstätt 
1155 fire destroys large parts of the church 
1190 consecration after re-establishment by bishop Otto von Eichstätt 
1542 first abolition of the monastery by Ottheinrich Pfalzgraf of Neuburg
1552 final abolition of the monastery by Ottheinrich Pfalzgraf of Neuburg
1618 recatholicising of Bergen
1635 delivery of the church and parts of the monastery goods to the Jesuits of Neuburg
1700 church and crypt are reconditioned and extended by 7 altars
1755 change of the church 
1758 consecration of the new building by prince bishop Raimund Anton of Eichstätt 
1799 tower altered
Around 1920 renovation of the church
2001-03 renewed renovation of the church

External links  
 Photos of the interior of Bergen Abbey Church, in the Warburg Institute Iconographic Database.

Villages in Bavaria
Neuburg an der Donau